Teodosie (died 25 January 1522), was the Voivode (Prince) of Wallachia,  a historical and geographical region in present-day Romania, between 1521 and 1522. He was the son and heir of Neagoe Basarab. Being too young to be the ruler, his regents were his mother, Serbian princess Milica Despina and his uncle, Preda Craiovescu of the Craiovești family. In the battle between the Draculești and the prince's army (10 October 1521), Preda Craiovescu died. As a result, Teodosie fled to Oltenia with his mother before seeking refuge in Istanbul.

Ancestors

References

Sources 
 

Rulers of Wallachia
Year of birth unknown
Romanian people of Serbian descent
1522 deaths
16th-century rulers in Europe